Interstate 285 (I-285) in the US state of North Carolina is the designation for a freeway connecting the cities of Lexington and Winston-Salem. The route was approved in February 2018 and was first signed in November 2018. An auxiliary route of I-85, it branches off of its parent route and runs northeast, bypassing central Lexington, before turning due north and heading toward Winston-Salem, terminating at an interchange with I-40. I-285 is cosigned with US Highway 52 (US 52) for its entire route, and as of November 2018, still uses US 52 milemarkers and exit numbers. Other routes cosigned along parts of the route include I-85 Business (I-85 Bus), US 29, US 70, and North Carolina Highway 8 (NC 8). I-285 has been approved for an extension along the US 52 freeway through Winston-Salem to meet the future Winston-Salem Northern Beltway.

Route description

The southern terminus of I-285 is at the southwestern corner of the city of Lexington, at a partial interchange with I-85, with northbound-to-northbound and southbound-to-southbound the only possible movement; other directions require the use of surface streets in Lexington, using exit 84 (NC 47), the first exit on I-285. From the southern terminus, the route is also cosigned with US 52, US 29, US 70, and I-85 Bus. The route follows the western boundary of Lexington's corporate limits, acting as a bypass of the city. Exit 85 is for Green Needles Road, while exit 86 provides access to Salisbury Road and Main Street, an old alignment of US 29/US 70. Exit 87 is a partial interchange and marks the northern end of the concurrency with I-85 Bus/US 29/US 70, which branch off to the northeast here. Exit 89 (US 64/Center Street) provides access for drivers heading from southbound I-85 Bus and northbound I-285, and vice-versa, as those movements are not covered at the direct interchange at exit 87. North of US 64, the route passes the communities of Bethesda and Welcome. At exit 89, NC 8 joins the freeway and the road turns from northeast to due north. The next interchange is exit 97 (Old US 52) which provides access to both Welcome and the community of Midway. After exit 100 (Hickory Tree Road), I-285 enters the city of Winston-Salem. Exit 103 is for South Main Street, and exit 105 is for Clemmonsville Road. The I-285 designation ends at exit 107 (I-40), though the freeway continues on as US 52/NC 8.

History
Approved by the American Association of State Highway and Transportation Officials (AASHTO) in September 2005, after receiving an earlier approval from the Federal Highway Administration (FHWA) in July 2005, intending to provide an Interstate-quality freeway to connect Winston-Salem to Charlotte (via a portion of I-85). The North Carolina Department of Transportation (NCDOT) installed "Future Interstate 285 Corridor" signs along the route in February 2006. The initial $2.5-million (equivalent to $ in ) project to improve the roadway to Interstate standards was approved in October 2011. With property acquisition already started in December 2012, cost estimates rose to $8.57 million (equivalent to $ in ). The contract was awarded to J.T. Russell and Sons Inc. of Albemarle for $7.6 million (equivalent to $ in ). Construction began in March 2014 and included reconstructing shoulders, improving drainage systems, resurfacing travel lanes, and realigning Marco Boulevard to accommodate a new southbound exit ramp alignment at Green Needles Road. In addition, crews resurfaced and preserved the bridges over Swearing Creek. The project was completed in late 2017.

On February 15, 2018, based on the completed improvements, the FHWA approved the I-285 signing between I-85 and I-40. In November 2018, NCDOT placed I-285 ground-mounted route shields along the route from I-85 to I-40.

Future
On May 20, 2019, AASHTO approved a request by NCDOT to establish Future I-285 north from its current northern terminus to a future I-74/I-274 interchange Winston-Salem Northern Beltway. The justification for the  extension was that Winston-Salem was a major transfer point for motor freight services and that numerous freight operators were already utilizing US 52 to access other major highways in and around the city; and that it would also serve the  Innovation Quarter, which will house research, business, and several college education facilities. The transition from future designation is dependent upon completion of the I-74/I-274 interchange and upgrades to interstate standards along the route. Other plans include possible widening to six total lanes (three in each direction).

Exit list
Current exit numbers are based on US 52 mileage.

References

External links

 NCRoads.com: I-285
 NC Future Interstates: I-285 Winston-Salem Connector

85-2
2 North Carolina
Transportation in Davidson County, North Carolina
Transportation in Forsyth County, North Carolina
Transportation in Winston-Salem, North Carolina